Borja García Menéndez (born 15 December 1982 in Valencia) is a Spanish racing driver. He last competed in the NASCAR Whelen Euro Series, having last driven for Alex Caffi Motorsport in a part-time effort in 2018. He was the 2004 Spanish Formula Three champion, and raced in the inaugural GP2 Series season.

Career

Garcia was born in Valencia. His career started in karting in 1993, where he stayed until 1999. He moved up to Spanish Formula Toyota in 2000, comfortably winning the title, before moving to Formula Nissan 2000 in 2001 with the Campos team, who now race in GP2 Series. He stayed in Nissan 2000 for 2002, driving for both the Esuela Lois and Venturini teams, whilst also racing some of the Spanish Formula Three season for the GTA team.

He raced the full Spanish F3 season in 2003 with the same team, before moving to the Racing Engineering outfit in 2004 with whom he won the title. Due to his success he stayed with the team as they moved to GP2 Series for 2005, where he partnered with Neel Jani.

In 2006 he raced in the Formula Renault 3.5 Series championship for the RC Motorsport team, finishing second overall behind Alx Danielsson. He returned to GP2 in 2007, driving for Durango.  He moved back to FR3.5 for 2008.

He was the driver of the Sevilla FC entry in the Superleague Formula for the 2008 season. He was the driver for all the rounds and Sevilla finished 10th in points with one win at the 2008 Donington round.

In 2009 he moved to the Atlantic Championship, where he would finish in seventh in the championship having scored 3 podium finishes.

Garcia made his stock car racing debut in 2013, when he entered the NASCAR Whelen Euro Series season finale round at Le Mans for Ford Autolix Competition and would score a podium finish in his very first race in the series. He made his full season debut the following year, finishing fifth in the championship and scoring a victory at Nürburgring after Garcia overtook pole sitter Ander Vilariño in the opening lap. After competing part-time in 2015, Garcia returned to full-time competition in 2016 with SPV Racing and later Double T by MRT Nocentini, finishing 11th overall in the standings with 4 podium finishes.

In 2017, Garcia began the season by sweeping both races in his home race in Valencia. He followed it up with two more victories at Venray and Hockenheim before ended up finishing third in the standings.

Racing record

Complete GP2 Series results
(key) (Races in bold indicate pole position) (Races in italics indicate fastest lap)

Complete Formula Renault 3.5 Series results
(key) (Races in bold indicate pole position) (Races in italics indicate fastest lap)

Superleague Formula

2008
(Races in bold indicate pole position) (Races in italics indicate fastest lap)

2010

NASCAR
(key) (Bold – Pole position awarded by qualifying time. Italics – Pole position earned by points standings or practice time. * – Most laps led.)

Whelen Euro Series - Elite 1

References

External links

Borja Garcia career statistics at Driver Database

1982 births
Living people
People from Zamora, Spain
Sportspeople from the Province of Zamora
Spanish racing drivers
GP2 Series drivers
Euroformula Open Championship drivers
Superleague Formula drivers
Atlantic Championship drivers
World Series Formula V8 3.5 drivers
NASCAR drivers
Racing Engineering drivers
Durango drivers
RC Motorsport drivers
Teo Martín Motorsport drivers
Campos Racing drivers